Abu al-Hasan as-Said al-Mutadid (abū al-ḥasan al-mu`taḍid bi-llah as-sa`īd ben al-mā'mūn; died 1248)  was an Almohad caliph who reigned from 1242 until his death. He was a son of Idris al-Ma'mun.

Life 
He succeeded his brother Abd al-Wahid II in a period in which the Almohads controlled only parts of present-day Morocco. During his reign, he tried to recover Meknes from the Marinids and Tlemcen from the Zayyanids. As-Said was able to obtain a contingent from the Marinids who made a nominal submission to him, but was killed by the Zayyanids in the Battle of Oujda after which his head was taken and ordered to be shown to his mother.

The Marinids then took the opportunity to conquer Fes, reducing the Almohads’ effective control to the Marrakesh area.

References

Sources
Julien, Charles-André. Histoire de l'Afrique du Nord, des origines à 1830, Payot, Paris, 1994.

1248 deaths
13th-century Almohad caliphs
Year of birth unknown
13th-century Berber people